Regional elections were held in France on 22 March 1992. At stake were the presidencies of each of France's 26 régions, which, although lacking legislative autonomy, manage sizeable budgets. The parliamentary right, led by the conservative Rally for the Republic and the centre-right Union for French Democracy won a landslide, winning 20 of 22 metropolitan regional presidencies. The Socialists only won the Limousin, while the Greens obtained the presidency of the Nord-Pas de Calais region.

The election was held using a one-round proportional system (with a 5% threshold).

External links
Election-Politique Regional Elections since 1986 (in french)

1992
French Regional Elections